Katherine East is a Canadian–British actress.

Her television and film credits include a variety of shows, among others Puck Hogs, My Babysitter's a Vampire (TV series), Being Erica, GravyTrain, Runaway, Blindness, MVP, Guns, Da Kink in My Hair, Puppets Who Kill, Puck Hogs, The Ron James Show, Covert Affairs, Saving Hope, Degrassi: The Next Generation, Sensitive Skin (Canadian TV series), Killjoys, 12 Monkeys (TV series), Cheerleader Death Squad (Pilot) and The Bill. She has also appeared on stage in various productions in Canada, the United Kingdom and Georgia.

She was raised in the indigenous community of Killarney (Shebahonaning) in Ontario, Canada - an isolated 500 person fishing village with a general store, a one-room schoolhouse and frozen lake roads located on the shore of Georgian Bay. She often homeschooled in the winter on her family's sailboat in the Bahamas. After travelling solo around the world at 18 she moved to Britain to study acting. She now resides in Toronto performing on both stage and screen.

References

External links
 

Living people
British stage actresses
Actresses from Ontario
Canadian film actresses
Canadian television actresses
Canadian stage actresses
Alumni of the Webber Douglas Academy of Dramatic Art
Place of birth missing (living people)
Year of birth missing (living people)